Baldwin Ngwa Afa'nwi (born 22 May 1990, in Cameroon) is a Cameroonian footballer.

Career

Kenya

Loaned to Kenyan club Rangers from Gor Mahia in 2012, Ngwa was debarred from playing in a 0-2 loss to Sofapaka during his stay there; following his loan spell, the Cameroonian intentionally cancelled his contract with Gor Mahia after one of their officials censured his decision to line up against his parent club, which, according to FIFA rules, is not allowed.

He took part in the 2012 CAF Champions League with Gor Mahia after returning from Tunisian club JS Kairouan.

Cambodia

A trialist for Phnom Penh Crown of the Cambodian League in 2014, Ngwa suffered a hamstring injury after trying out for Vietnamese team Than Quang Ninh at the start of the year. Next, he transferred to another Cambodian team, Asia Euro United, for the rest of the 2014 season where he put in a number of solid performances, including a hat-trick facing National Police that same year. This was succeeded by a move to Nagaworld FC in 2015, where he stayed until returning to Asia Euro United, authoring a brace in a 2-0 win over former club Phnom Penh Crown.

During his stay in Phnom Penh Crown, the striker netted three goals within 20 minutes in a friendly opposing Albirex Niigata Phnom Penh.

References 

Tunisian Ligue Professionnelle 1 players
Association football forwards
Gor Mahia F.C. players
Expatriate footballers in Cambodia
Cameroonian footballers
JS Kairouan players
Expatriate footballers in Tunisia
Expatriate footballers in Kenya
1990 births
Cameroonian expatriate footballers
Expatriate footballers in Oman
Living people
Angkor Tiger FC players
Nagaworld FC players